Wojciech Żaliński (born 8 January 1988) is a Polish volleyball player. At the professional club level, he plays for ZAKSA Kędzierzyn-Koźle.

Personal life
His sister, Katarzyna Brojek (born 1986) is also a volleyball player. He is married to Diana. On 19 May 2012, their son Franciszek was born. On 11 June 2017, his wife gave birth to their second child, a daughter named Aleksandra.

Honours

Clubs
 CEV Champions League
  2021/2022 – with ZAKSA Kędzierzyn-Koźle

 CEV Challenge Cup
  2011/2012 – with AZS Politechnika Warszawska

 National championships
 2021/2022  Polish Cup, with ZAKSA Kędzierzyn-Koźle
 2021/2022  Polish Championship, with ZAKSA Kędzierzyn-Koźle
 2022/2023  Polish Cup, with ZAKSA Kędzierzyn-Koźle

Universiade
 2013  Summer Universiade

Individual awards
 2019: Polish Championship – Best Server

References

External links

 
 Player profile at PlusLiga.pl 
 Player profile at Volleybox.net

1988 births
Living people
People from Skarżysko County
Sportspeople from Świętokrzyskie Voivodeship
Polish men's volleyball players
Universiade medalists in volleyball
Universiade silver medalists for Poland
Medalists at the 2013 Summer Universiade
Projekt Warsaw players
Trefl Gdańsk players
Czarni Radom players
AZS Olsztyn players
ZAKSA Kędzierzyn-Koźle players
Outside hitters